Galileo (also known as Galileo Galilei) is a 1968 Italian-Bulgarian biographical drama film directed by Liliana Cavani. It depicts the life of Galileo Galilei and particularly his clash with the Catholic Church regarding the interpretation of his astronomical observations with the newly invented telescope.

Plot 
In 1597, the scientist Galileo Galilei meets the philosopher Giordano Bruno, author of treatises that upset the Church for their extreme accuracy on the nature of the world. In fact the period is that of the oppressor and the Counter-Reformation and Bruno having worsened his relations with the Church, is unjustly tried and condemned to the stake. Meanwhile, Galileo receives a gift of a telescope from a friend, and perfects its potential. Thanks to it, therefore the scientist makes his first experiments on the stars and began to write his treatises. But the new Pope Urbano VIII and his beloved cardinal discover these theories, find them heretical and order the scientist to recant publicly.

Cast 
Cyril Cusack as Galileo Galilei
Georgi Kaloyanchev as  Giordano Bruno
Nevena Kokanova as  Marina
Nikolay Doychev as  Cardinal Bellarmino
Gheorghi Cerkelov as  Paolo Sarpi
Piero Vida as Pope Urban VIII
Gigi Ballista as  Dominican Commissioner
Paolo Graziosi as Gian Lorenzo Bernini
Maia Dragomaska as the Galilei's daughter 
Lou Castel as  the young monk of the Vatican
Giulio Brogi as Sagredo

Home media 
Galileo was released in 2010 as a Region 2 DVD. A Region 1 DVD has not been released.

See also 
Galileo is a 1975 English language film based on Bertolt Brecht's play Life of Galileo. See the article by Cristina Olivotto and Antonella Testa for a comparison of the 1968 and 1975 films.

References

External links

1968 films
1960s biographical drama films
1960s historical drama films
1960s multilingual films
Bulgarian biographical drama films
1960s Italian-language films
English-language Italian films
English-language Bulgarian films
1960s English-language films
Italian multilingual films
Bulgarian multilingual films
Bulgarian historical drama films
Films scored by Ennio Morricone
Films directed by Liliana Cavani
Italian biographical drama films
Italian historical drama films
Films shot in Bulgaria
Films set in the 1590s
Films set in Rome
Cultural depictions of Galileo Galilei
Cultural depictions of Giordano Bruno
1968 drama films
1960s Italian films